City College Plymouth is a tertiary institution and further education college in South West England offering a range of technical, professional and vocational qualifications, Apprenticeships, Access to Higher Education and Foundation Degree courses, plus professional and bespoke training to local employers.

The College is a partner college of the University of Plymouth, who support their Foundation Degree provision.

Originally the Plymouth and Devonport Technical College, which opened in 1897 in Paradise Road, it was relocated in new premises built on a former railway station site directly opposite at Kings Road, where it opened as the College of Further Education, Plymouth, in 1970. Later becoming the Plymouth College of Further Education, it was officially renamed on 1 January 2007.

Campuses and facilities
The College is currently based on Kings Road in Devonport, with an additional base at Piquet Barracks. The College has industry-standard facilities, including training kitchens, performance and production studios, engineering and construction workshops. It previously had another campus focused on STEM at the Goschen Centre in Keyham, however, this was closed in the autumn of 2016 to build a new STEM building at the main Kings Road campus.

The College opened a £13m Regional Centre of Excellence for STEM (science, technology, engineering and maths) in September 2017. This centre, which aims to train students in key priority sectors for the City, replicates ‘real work’ environments across a range of industry sectors. The Centre is supported by the Heart of the South West Local Enterprise Partnership (LEP) Growth Deal, DBIS Regional Growth Fund and Plymouth City Council.

Opened in 2015, the College's Marine Training Centre offers specialist marine training for apprentices and students aged 16 – 18 undertaking full-time courses in marine engineering and other nautical related programmes at the College and is supported by Princess Yachts International plc.

In 2013, the College completed a refurbishment of its Engineering Centre, providing new equipment and workshops - including for automotive, plumbing, fabrication and welding - which reflect the sector in the 21st Century.

The College also hosts a smaller STEM Centre (opened in 2014) which is a specially designed teaching facility and exhibition space, delivering educational and instructional activities in the areas of science, technology, engineering and mathematics - it is located at the College's Kings Road campus.

Alumni
 Anton Piotrowski, Masterchef Winner 2012, former Chef Patron of the Michelin Starred Treby Arms, Sparkwell,
 Charleine Wain, candidate on BBC's The Apprentice 2015, Owner of Maiya's Hair and Beauty Salon (currently rebranding as Charleine Wain Salon), Plymouth 
 David Rowe, Managing Director of Applied Automation
 Jonathan Morcom, Director of the Duke of Cornwall Hotel
 Chris Gates, Managing Director of Princess Yachts plc
 John Van der Kiste, author

References

External links

 City College Plymouth Official website of City College Plymouth.
 ccpsu Official website of City College Plymouth Students' Union

Education in Plymouth, Devon
Further education colleges in Devon
Further education colleges in the Collab Group
Buildings and structures in Plymouth, Devon